The Karenga Community Wildlife Management Area (KCWMA) is a conservation area in north-eastern Uganda.

Ecology
The KCWMA is in the Northern Acacia-Commiphora bushlands and thickets ecosystem, part of the Kidepo Valley National Park critical landscape.

Conservation
Among the challenges in the KCWMA are wildlife poaching, lack of adequate infrastructure for eco-tourists, and unsustainable use of natural resources, such as charcoal manufacturing.

References

External links

Nature conservation in Uganda
Wildlife sanctuaries of Uganda